Sahitya Akademi Award is given each year, since 1955, by Sahitya Akademi (India's National Academy of Letters), to writers and their works, for their outstanding contribution to the upliftment of Indian literature and Kannada literature in particular. No Awards were conferred in 1957 and 1963.

Sahitya Akademi Award recipients

Key

Bhasha Samman awardees

Akademi Translation Prize winners

Yuva Puraskara winners

Bala Sahitya Puraskara winners

References

Sahitya Akademi Award

Kannada